Mario Santilli (born 27 June 1984) is an Argentine footballer. His current club is Venezuelan Primera División side Deportivo La Guaira.

References
 Profile at BDFA 
 

1984 births
Living people
Argentine footballers
Argentine expatriate footballers
Central Córdoba de Rosario footballers
Coquimbo Unido footballers
Club Sol de América footballers
Expatriate footballers in Chile
Expatriate footballers in Paraguay
Association football goalkeepers
Argentine people of Italian descent
Footballers from Rosario, Santa Fe